William Adrain (26 January 1926 – 19 November 1997) was a Scottish international lawn bowler.

Bowls career
He started playing bowls aged 12 after being introduced to the sport by his father who was a bowls greenkeeper and his brother also called Willie was a Scottish international.

He competed in the first World Bowls Championship in Kyeemagh, New South Wales, Australia in 1966  and won a bronze medal in the fours with Willie Dyet, Bert Thomson and Harry Reston at the event. He also won a silver medal in the team event (Leonard Trophy).

He also won the 1963 Scottish National Bowls Championships singles title.

Personal life
His father James was the greenkeeper at the Dreghorn Bowling Club and introduced him to bowls when he was aged 12. His own son George Adrain was a commonwealth and two times world champion.

References

1926 births
1997 deaths
Scottish male bowls players
Sportspeople from North Ayrshire